Stouts Mills is an unincorporated community in Gilmer County, West Virginia, United States.

The community was named after one Mr. Stout, the proprietor of a local mill.

References

Unincorporated communities in Gilmer County, West Virginia
Unincorporated communities in West Virginia